Cordray is a surname. Notable people with the surname include:

Kenny Cordray (1954–2017), American guitarist and songwriter
Richard Cordray (born 1959), American lawyer and politician

See also
Corddry
Corday

English-language surnames